Ralph Flewelling may refer to:

 Ralph Tyler Flewelling (1871–?), American philosophy professor
 Ralph Carlin Flewelling (1894–1975), American architect